The Russian military intervention in the Syrian Civil War started on 30 September 2015, with 4,000 Russian military personnel being stationed in Syria. The Russian forces also consisted of 25 strategic bombers, 20 tactical bombers, 12 attack bombers, 8 fighter aircraft, 16 attack helicopters and various other aircraft.

As of spring 2019, there have been 116 officially confirmed Russian Armed Forces fatalities in the war. Also, two investigative groups, Fontanka and the Moscow-based Conflict Intelligence Team (CIT), reported a conservative estimate of at least 73–101 private military contractors (PMCs) being killed between October 2015 and mid-December 2017, 40–60 of whom died during the first several months of 2017, according to Fontanka and one more PMC was killed in late December 2017.  In early 2018, the founder of CIT stated the PMCs' death toll was at least 100–200, while another CIT blogger said at least 150 were killed and more than 900 were wounded. They belonged to the Russian company "Wagner". In February 2018, a number of Russian PMCs were reported to have been killed during the Battle of Khasham. Estimation of casualties varies with some sources reported up to 200 Russian contractors died during the strikes.   On 4 January 2020, the Syrian Observatory for Human Rights said that 264 Russian servicemen and PMCs were killed in Syria during the civil war.

In addition, at least 23 fighters have been killed that were possibly regular military, but their status has not been officially confirmed.

List of fatalities

Confirmed 
The following list contains 135 servicemen listed as killed among the regular Russian Armed Forces and 4 officers of the Russian Federal Security Service:

Status unclear 
The following list contains another 23 killed that were possibly regular military, but were not officially confirmed.

Out-of-country deaths related to the operation
On 25 December 2016, a Russian military Tupolev Tu-154 with 92 people on board crashed in the Black Sea during a flight from Sochi International Airport, Russia to Khmeimim, Syria. There were no survivors. Among those killed were: 64 members of the Alexandrov Ensemble choir, nine journalists, eight crew members, eight other passenger soldiers, two federal civil servants and a prominent Russian humanitarian worker.

See also 
List of aviation shootdowns and accidents during the Syrian Civil War that include Russian aircraft lost during the Syrian Civil War.
Wagner Group

References 

Islamic State of Iraq and the Levant and Russia
Russian military intervention in the Syrian civil war
Russia–Turkey military relations